Arthur Alan Wilson  was an Australian politician. He was the Labor member for Collie in the Western Australian Legislative Assembly from 1908 to 1947.

He was also a writer and editor.

References

1864 births
1948 deaths
Members of the Western Australian Legislative Assembly
Scottish emigrants to colonial Australia
Australian Officers of the Order of the British Empire
Burials at Karrakatta Cemetery